Bork is a surname. Notable people with the surname include:

Detlev Bork (born 1967), German classical and flamenco guitarist
Erik Bork, American screenwriter and producer
Frank Bork (born 1940), American baseball pitcher
George Bork (born 1942), American football player
Kennard Baker Bork (born 1940), American geologist
Max Bork (1899–1973), Generalleutnant in the Wehrmacht during World War II
Robert Bork (1927–2012), American legal scholar and rejected Supreme Court nominee
William James Bork III (1970-pres.), Death Metal bassist in Necrophagia